Lake Muskoka/Mortimer's Point Water Aerodrome  is located  south of Port Carling, Ontario, Canada.

See also
 List of airports in the Port Carling area

References

Registered aerodromes in Ontario
Seaplane bases in Ontario